Waverly Hall is a town in Harris County, Georgia, United States. It is part of the Columbus, Georgia-Alabama Metropolitan Statistical Area. The population was 735 at the 2010 census, and in 2018 the estimated population was 747.

History
A post office called Waverly was established in 1829. The community derives its name from Sir Walter Scott's Waverley novels.

The Georgia General Assembly incorporated Waverly Hall as a town in 1914.

Geography

Waverly Hall is located in west-central Georgia within the Piedmont geographical region at  (32.684607, -84.738405), in eastern Harris County. Alternate U.S. Route 27 and Georgia State Route 85 run northeast to southeast through the city, leading southwest  to Columbus and north  to Shiloh. The two highways meet Georgia State Route 208 in the northern city limits.

Demographics

As of the census of 2000, there were 709 people, 249 households, and 176 families residing in the town. The racial makeup of the town was 50.92% White, 47.53% African American, 0.14% Native American, 0.56% Asian, 0.14% from other races, and 0.71% from two or more races. Hispanic or Latino of any race were 0.56% of the population.

There were 249 households, out of which 31.7% had children under the age of 18 living with them, 46.2% were married couples living together, 20.5% had a female householder with no husband present, and 29.3% were non-families. 27.3% of all households were made up of individuals, and 13.3% had someone living alone who was 65 years of age or older. The average household size was 2.46 and the average family size was 2.94.

In the town, the population was spread out, with 22.4% under the age of 18, 4.9% from 18 to 24, 20.5% from 25 to 44, 28.3% from 45 to 64, and 23.8% who were 65 years of age or older. The median age was 46 years. For every 100 females, there were 78.6 males. For every 100 females age 18 and over, there were 76.8 males.

The median income for a household in the town was $30,250, and the median income for a family was $36,458. Males had a median income of $40,000 versus $16,923 for females. The per capita income for the town was $13,388. About 20.7% of families and 26.7% of the population were below the poverty line, including 29.9% of those under age 18 and 21.6% of those age 65 or over.

Arts and culture
The Village Green rail trail offers residents a walking track and playground.

References

Towns in Harris County, Georgia
Towns in Georgia (U.S. state)
Columbus metropolitan area, Georgia